Liz Kimmins MLA  is a Sinn Féin politician who has served as Member of the Legislative Assembly for the Newry and Armagh constituency in the Northern Ireland Assembly since January 2020.

References

Living people
Sinn Féin MLAs
Female members of the Northern Ireland Assembly
Year of birth missing (living people)
Place of birth missing (living people)
Northern Ireland MLAs 2017–2022
Northern Ireland MLAs 2022–2027
21st-century women politicians from Northern Ireland